Goodrich Robert Fenner (August 12, 1891 – February 14, 1966) was the fifth bishop of Kansas in The Episcopal Church between 1939 and 1959.

Early life and education
Fenner was born on August 2, 1891 in Beeville, Texas, the son of Robert Willis Fenner and Kate Elliott Fenner. He was one of a family of six sons and three daughters. Fenner studied at the Texas Agricultural and Mechanical College, graduating with a Bachelor of Science in Civil Engineering in 1913. He also undertook studies at the General Theological Seminary from where he earned a Bachelor of Sacred Theology in 1916, a Master of Sacred Theology in 1934, and an honorary Doctor of Sacred Theology in 1938.

Ordained ministry
Fenner was ordained deacon on May 7, 1916 by the Coadjutor Bishop of Virginia Arthur Selden Lloyd for the Diocese of West Texas and then priest by Bishop William Theodotus Capers of West Texas on November 12, 1916 at St Philip's Church, Uvalde, Texas. He served as rector of St Philip's Church in Uvalde between 1916 and 1924 and then rector of Christ Church in Dallas, Texas between 1924 and 1932. He also served as chaplain in the United States Army in 1918. In 1932 he was appointed secretary to the Rural division of the National Council Episcopal Church, a post he retained until 1935 when he became rector of St Andrew's Church in Kansas City, Missouri.

Bishop
Fenner was elected Coadjutor Bishop of Kansas on the first ballot by the diocesan convention which met on May 9, 1937 at Grace Church in Chanute, Kansas.  He was consecrated bishop in Grace Cathedral on September 29, 1937 by Bishop James H. Wise of Kansas. He then succeeded as diocesan on July 8, 1939 after the sudden death of Bishop Wise. During his episcopacy new congregations were established and university chaplaincies at the University of Kansas and at Kansas State University came into being. Fenner retired in 1959 and died of a heart attack in 1966.

References

1891 births
1966 deaths
People from Highland Park, Texas
20th-century American Episcopalians
Episcopal bishops of Kansas
20th-century American clergy
General Theological Seminary alumni
Texas A&M University alumni